The torpedo boat Panormos served in the Royal Hellenic Navy from 1919–1928.  Originally the ship was the Austro-Hungarian Fiume-class torpedo boat SMS Tb 92-F. She was named for the city of Panormos (today known as Bandırma) located on the Sea of Marmara; the city was part of the territory awarded to Greece for joining the side of the allied in the Treaty of Sèvres at the end of World War I.

The ship, along with two sister ships of the Fiume-class torpedo boats Pergamos and Proussa was transferred to Greece as a war reparation from the Central Powers in 1919  and were named after cities in Asia Minor.

Service in the Austro-Hungarian navy
In the build-up to the First World War, Austria-Hungary ordered four 250–tonne boats to be built at the Ganz & Co.– Danubius shipyard in 1912/13. The Navy asked for several improvements compared with the Trieste class boats. Negotiations broke down in early December because of exaggerated prices requested by Danubius and were only resumed when pressured by the Hungarian Minister of Commerce. Danubius lowered its price by 10%. Finally Ganz & Co. – Danubius got orders for 16 torpedoboats in 1913, despite the fact that original plans had called for the Naval Arsenal at Pola to build the Tb 86 to Tb 100 series. These ‘Fiume–boats’ were commissioned under the numbers Tb 82 F to Tb 97 F between August, 1914 and August, 1916. They differed from their Trieste sister–ships having two funnels and an extended forecastle.

Service in the Greek navy
Panormos served in the Greek navy from 1919 during the Greco-Turkish War (1919–1922) and thereafter until she was sunk off Cape Tourlos, Aegina in March, 1928.

References

See also
History of the Hellenic Navy

Torpedo boats of the Hellenic Navy
Shipwrecks in the Aegean Sea
1915 ships
Maritime incidents in 1928
Ships built in Austria-Hungary